The annual Portage Ceramic Awards is New Zealand's premier ceramics event. Established in 2001, the awards are funded by The Trusts Charitable Foundation and administered by Te Uru Waitakere Contemporary Gallery (formerly Lopdell House Gallery). A national award, the Portage Ceramics Awards also acknowledge West Auckland's long history of ceramic practice, dating back to 1852.

The competition

Entry is available to artists of New Zealand citizenship. The annual awards are judged each year by a different international judge, usually from the field of ceramics. An open call is made for entries, and since the third award onwards the judge has selected a group of finalists for exhibition. An exhibition is held at Te Uru and a publication produced. In 2020, due to complications from the Covid-19 pandemic, a survey exhibition of previous winners titled Portage 20/20 was presented in lieu of a competition.

Residencies

In 2013 two international residencies were announced as part of the awards: the Guldagergaard residency in Skaelskor, Denmark, awarded to Richard Stratton and a residency in Medalta, Medicine Hat, Canada, awarded to Melissa Ford.

In 2014 a workshop scholarship to the Peters Valley School of Craft in New Jersey was awarded to Chris Weaver.

Award winners

References

Arts in New Zealand
New Zealand awards
New Zealand art awards